The Yuba County Five were a group of young men from Yuba City, California, with mild intellectual disabilities or psychiatric conditions, who attended a college basketball game at California State University, Chico, on the night of February 24, 1978. Four of them—Bill Sterling, 29; Jack Huett, 24; Ted Weiher, 32; and Jack Madruga, 30—were later found dead; the fifth, Gary Mathias, 25, has never been found.

Several days after their initial disappearance, the group's car, a Mercury Montego, was found abandoned in a remote area of Plumas National Forest, California, on a high mountain dirt road that was far out of their way back to Yuba City. Investigators could not determine why the car was abandoned, as it was in good working order and could easily have been pushed out of the snowpack it was in. At that time, no trace of the men was found.

After the snow melted in June 1978, four of the men's bodies were found in and near a trailer camp used by backpackers as shelter, deep in the forest,  from the car. Only bones were left of the three bodies in the woods, a result of scavenging animals; but the one in the trailer, Ted Weiher, had apparently lived for as long as three months after the men were last seen, starving to death despite an ample supply of food and heating materials nearby. Weiher was missing his shoes, and investigators found Mathias' own shoes in the nearby woods, suggesting Mathias also survived for some time beyond the last night they were seen alive.

A witness later came forward, a local man who said he had spent the same night in his own car, a short distance away from where the Montego was found. This witness told police that he had seen and heard people around the car that night, and twice called for help, only for them to grow silent and turn off their flashlights. This, and the considerable distance from the car to where the bodies were found, has led to suspicions of foul play.

Background

While he was stationed in West Germany as part of his United States Army service in the early 1970s, Gary Mathias, a native of Yuba City, California, developed drug problems. This eventually led to him being diagnosed with schizophrenia and being psychiatrically discharged. Mathias returned to his parents' home in Yuba City and began treatment at a local mental hospital. While it had been difficult at first—he was nearly arrested for assault twice and often experienced psychotic episodes that landed him in a local Veterans Administration hospital—by 1978, Mathias was being treated on an outpatient basis with Stelazine and Cogentin and was considered by his physicians to be "one of our sterling success cases".

Mathias supplemented his Army disability pay by working in his stepfather's gardening business. Off the job, outside of his family, he was close friends with four slightly older men who either had slight intellectual disabilities (Sterling and Huett) or were informally considered "slow learners" (Weiher and Madruga, also an Army veteran). The men lived in Yuba City and nearby Marysville. Like Mathias, each man lived with his parents, all of whom referred to them collectively as "the boys".

The five men's favorite leisure activity was sports. Their families said that when they got together, it was usually to play a game or to watch one. They played basketball together on a team called the Gateway Gators. This team was supported by a local program for people with mental disabilities.

On February 25, the Gators were due to play their first game in a weeklong tournament sponsored by the Special Olympics for which the winners would get a free week in Los Angeles. The five men had prepared the night before, some even laying out their uniforms and asking their parents to wake them up on time. They decided to drive to Chico that night to cheer on the UC Davis basketball team in an away game against Chico State. The men wore only light coats against the cool temperatures in the upper Sacramento Valley at night that time of year.

Disappearance

After the Davis team won the game, the group got back into Madruga's car and drove a short distance from the Chico State campus to Behr's Market in downtown Chico. There they bought snacks along with sodas and cartons of milk to drink. It was shortly before the store's 10 p.m. closing time; the clerk later remembered the men because she was annoyed that such a large group had come in and delayed her from beginning the process of closing the store for the night.

None of the men were seen alive again after that point. At their homes, some of their parents waited up to make sure they returned. When morning came and they had not, the police were notified.

Investigation

Police in Butte and Yuba counties began searching along the route the men took to Chico. They found no sign of them, but a few days later, a Plumas National Forest ranger told investigators that he had seen the Montego parked along Oroville-Quincy Road in the forest on February 25. At the time, he had not considered it significant, since many residents often drove up that road into the Sierra Nevada on winter weekends to go cross-country skiing on the extensive trail system, but after he read the missing persons bulletin, he recognized the car and led the deputies to it on February 28.

Discovery of the car

Inside the car was evidence suggesting the men had been inside it between when they were last seen and when it was abandoned. The wrappers and empty cartons and cans they had purchased in Chico were present, along with programs from the basketball game they had watched and a neatly folded road map of California. However, the discovery of the car raised more questions than it answered.

One question was its location,  from Chico, far off any direct route to Yuba City or Marysville. None of the men's families could speculate as to why they might have driven up a long and winding dirt road on a winter night deep into a high-elevation remote forest, without any extra clothing and on the night before a basketball game they had been discussing excitedly for several weeks. Madruga's parents said he did not like the cold weather and had never been up into the mountains. Sterling's father had once taken his son to the area near where the car was found for a fishing weekend, but the younger man had not enjoyed it and remained at home when his father took later trips there.

Police could not figure out why the men had abandoned the car. They had reached  in elevation along the road, about where the snow line was at that time of year, just short of where the road was closed for the winter. The car had become stuck in some snow drifts, and there was evidence that the men had tried to spin the wheels to get out of it; police noted that the snow was not so deep that five healthy young men would not have been able to push it out. The keys were not present, suggesting at first that the car had been abandoned because it might not have been functioning properly, with the intention of returning later with help; when police hot-wired the car, the engine started immediately, and the fuel gauge indicated the gasoline tank was one quarter full.

The mystery deepened after police towed the car back to the station for a more thorough examination. The Montego's undercarriage had no dents, gouges, or even mud scrapes, not even on its low-hanging muffler, despite having been driven a long distance up a mountain road with many bumps and ruts. Either the driver had been extremely careful, or it was someone familiar with the road, a familiarity Madruga was not known to have; his family said that Madruga would not have let someone else drive the car. The car was unlocked and had a window rolled down when it was found; his family indicated it was unlike him to leave the car so unsecured.

Efforts to search the vicinity were hampered by a severe snowstorm that day. Two days later, after searchers in Snowcats nearly became lost themselves, further search efforts were called off due to continuing bad weather. No trace of the men was found other than the car.

Sightings

In response to local media coverage of the case, police received several reports of some or all of the men being sighted after they had left Chico, including some reports of them being seen elsewhere in California or the country. Most of the reports were easily dismissed, but two of the sightings stood out. Joseph Schons of Sacramento told police he inadvertently wound up spending the night of February 24–25 near where the Montego was found. He had driven up there, where he had a cabin, to check the snowpack in advance of a weekend ski trip with his family. At 5:30 p.m., about  up the road, he, too, had gotten stuck in the snow. In the process of trying to free it, he realized he was beginning to experience the early symptoms of a heart attack and went back in, keeping the engine running to provide heat.

Six hours later, lying in the car and experiencing severe pain, he saw headlights coming up behind him. Looking out, he saw a car parked behind him, headlights on, with a group of people around it, one of which seemed to him to be a woman holding a baby. He called to them for help, but they stopped talking and turned their headlights out. Later, he saw more lights from behind him, this time flashlights, that also went out when he called to them.

After that, Schons said at first, he recalled a pickup truck parking  behind him briefly, and then continuing on down the road. Later, he clarified to police that he could not be sure of that, since at the time he was almost delirious from the pain he was in. After Schons' car ran out of gas in the early morning hours, his pain subsided enough for him to walk  down the road to a lodge, where the manager drove him back home, passing the abandoned Montego at the point where he had recalled hearing the voices originate from. Doctors later confirmed that he had indeed experienced a mild heart attack.

Weiher's mother said ignoring someone's pleas for help was not like her son, if indeed he had been present. She recalled how he and Sterling had helped someone they knew get to the hospital after overdosing on Valium.

The other notable report was from a woman who worked at a store in the small town of Brownsville,  from the point where the car had been abandoned, which they would have reached had they continued down the road from where the car had been found. On March 3, the woman, who saw fliers that had been distributed with the men's pictures and information about the $1,215 ($ in  dollars), reward the families had put up, told deputies that four of them had stopped at the store in a red pickup truck, two days after the disappearance. The store owner corroborated her account.

The woman said she immediately realized that the men were not from the area because of their "big eyes and facial expressions". Two of the men, whom she identified as Huett and Sterling, were in a telephone booth outside the store, while the other two went inside. The police said she was "a credible witness" and they took her account seriously.

Additional details came from the store owner, who told investigators that men whom he believed to be Weiher and Huett came in and bought burritos, chocolate milk and soft drinks. Weiher's brother told the Los Angeles Times that while driving to Brownsville in a different car in apparent ignorance of the basketball game seemed completely out of character for them, the owner's description of the two men's behavior seemed consistent with them, as Weiher would "eat anything he could get his hands on" and was often accompanied by Huett more than any of the other four. Huett's brother said Jack hated using telephones to the point that he would answer calls for Jack whenever he received any from the other men in the group.

Discovery of bodies

With the evidence not pointing to any clear conclusion about what happened the night the five men disappeared, police and the families were not ruling out the possibility that they had met with foul play. The eventual discovery of four of the five men's bodies seemed to suggest otherwise, but raised even more questions about what had happened that night, and whether at least one of them might have been rescued.

The front window of the trailer had been broken. When they opened the door, they were overcome by the odor of what turned out to be a decaying body inside. It was later identified as Weiher's.

Searchers returned to Plumas, following the road between the trailer and the site of the Montego. The next day, they found remains that were later identified as those of Madruga and Sterling on opposite sides of the road  from where the car had been. Madruga's body had been partially consumed by scavenging animals; only bones remained of Sterling, scattered over a small area. Autopsies showed that they both died of hypothermia. Deputies think that one of them may have given in to the need to sleep that comes with the last stages of hypothermia, while the other stayed by his side and died the same way.

His shoes and jeans nearby helped identify the body. His death, too, was attributed to hypothermia.

In an area to the northwest of the trailer, roughly a quarter-mile from it, searchers found three Forest Service blankets and a rusted flashlight by the road. It could not be determined how long those items had been there. Since Mathias had presumably not taken his medication, pictures of him were distributed to mental institutions all over California. However, no trace of him has ever been found.

Evidence in trailer

Weiher's body was on a bed with eight sheets wrapped around it, including the head. The autopsy showed that he had died of a combination of starvation and hypothermia. Weiher had lost nearly half his ; the growth of his beard suggested he had lived as long as thirteen weeks from when he had last shaved. His feet were badly frostbitten, almost gangrenous. On a table next to the bed were some of Weiher's personal effects, including his wallet (with cash), a nickel ring with "Ted" engraved on it, and a gold necklace he also wore. Also on the table was a gold watch, without its crystal, which Weiher's family said was not his, and a partially melted candle. He was wearing a velour shirt and lightweight pants, but his shoes could not be found.

Most puzzling to the investigators was how Weiher had come to his fate. No fire had been set in the trailer's fireplace, despite an ample supply of matches and paperback novels to use as kindling. Heavy forestry clothing, which could have kept the men warm, also remained where it had been stored. A dozen C-ration cans from a storage shed outside had been opened and their contents consumed, but a locker in the same shed that held an even greater assortment of dehydrated foods, enough to keep all five men fed for a year if that had been necessary, had not even been opened. Similarly, another shed nearby held a butane tank with a valve that, had it been opened, would have fed the trailer's heating system. Weiher's family members said that he lacked common sense as a result of his mental disability. For example, he often asked why he should stop at a stop sign, and one night he had to be dragged out of bed while the ceiling of his bedroom was burning in a house fire because he was afraid he would miss his job if he got up.

It also seemed that Weiher had not been alone in the trailer, and that Mathias and possibly Huett had been there with him. Mathias's tennis sneakers were in the trailer, and the C-rations had been opened with a P-38 can opener, with which only Mathias or Madruga would have been familiar from their military service. Mathias, his feet perhaps also swollen from frostbite, could have decided to put Weiher's shoes on instead if he had ventured outside. The sheets all over Weiher's body also suggested that one of the others had been there with him, as his gangrenous feet would have been in too much pain for him to pull them over his body himself.

Theory

Even knowing that four of the five men had died in the Sierra, investigators still could not completely explain what had led to their deaths. They still had found no explanation for why the men were there, although they learned that Mathias had friends in the small town of Forbestown, and police believed it was possible that, in an attempt to visit them on the way back home, the men may have taken a wrong turn near Oroville that put them on the mountain road. For whatever reason, the men had left the Montego; they had, instead of going back down the road (where they had passed the lodge that Schons later returned to), continued along the road in the direction they were originally going. Purposeful motion like that is not consistent with the circular patterns traveled by those who genuinely believe themselves lost.

The day before the men went missing, a Forest Service Snowcat had gone along the road in that direction to clear snow off the trailer roof so it would not collapse. Most likely, Madruga and Sterling died of hypothermia about halfway through the long walk to the trailer.

It is assumed that once they found the trailer, the other three broke the window to enter. Since it was locked, they may have believed it was private property, and may have feared arrest for theft if they used anything else they found there. After Weiher died, or after the others thought he had died, they may have decided to try to get back to civilization by different ways, such as walking overland.

See also

 Dyatlov Pass incident, 1959 incident in Russia in which nine hikers died under mysterious circumstances; the case of the Yuba County Five is often referred to as the "American Dyatlov Pass"
 
 List of people who disappeared
 List of solved missing persons cases

Notes

References

1970s missing person cases
1978 in California
Deaths from hypothermia
February 1978 events in the United States
Missing person cases in California
Plumas National Forest